Euthumn "Eudie" Napier (January 3, 1913 – March 16, 1983) was an American baseball catcher in the Negro leagues. He played with the Homestead Grays in 1941, and from 1946 to 1948. He also played in the Provincial League in 1949 and 1951 with the Farnham Pirates.

References

External links
 and Seamheads

1913 births
1983 deaths
Homestead Grays players
Farnham Pirates players
Baseball players from Georgia (U.S. state)
20th-century African-American sportspeople
Baseball catchers